Allahyar Sayyadmanesh (born 29 June 2001) is an Iranian professional footballer who plays as a forward for Hull City and the Iran national team.

In 2018, he was named by The Guardian as one of the 60 best young talents in world football.

Club career

Early years
Sayyadmanesh started to play club football when he was 8. He began his career at Arash Amol, where he was top goalscorer in Iran's under-10 league. After four years, he joined Padideh Sari, where he spent two years. He later spent a year in Saipa's youth academy.

Esteghlal

On 12 June 2018, Sayyadmanesh signed a five-year contract with Esteghlal. He was assigned the number 16 shirt, previously worn by Mehdi Ghaedi, who decided to change his number.

Fenerbahçe
On 3 May 2019, Sayyadmanesh signed a five-year contract with Turkish club Fenerbahçe in a $850,000 transfer. He was loaned to TFF 1. League club İstanbulspor on 2 September 2019 on a season-long loan. Sayyadmanesh left Fenerbahçe on 9 July 2022 to join English Club Hull City.

Zorya Luhansk
On 6 October 2020, Sayyadmanesh was loaned to Ukrainian club Zorya Luhansk on a year-and-a-half long deal, with an option to buy him for €3.5 million. On 25 October 2020, he scored on his league debut for Zorya in a 4–0 win against Rukh Lviv. On 3 December 2020, he scored the winning goal in a 1–0 win against English Premier League club Leicester City in the group stage of the Europa League. Sayyadmanesh was selected to be among the UPL's best eleven players of the 2020–21 season.

Hull City
On 31 January 2022, Sayyadmanesh was loaned to English club Hull City on a half-year deal until the end of the 2021–22 season. He made his debut on 5 February 2022 in the home match against Preston North End when he came on as an 84th-minute substitute for Richie Smallwood.
On 15 April 2022, Sayyadmanesh scored on his league debut for Hull City in a 2–1 win against Cardiff City.

On 9 July 2022, Sayyadmanesh signed permanently for the English club Hull City from Turkish side Fenerbahçe with transfer fee €4.5 million. He signed a four year contract with an option of a further year.

International career 

Sayyadmanesh was a member of the Iran U17 national team which qualified for the 2017 FIFA U-17 World Cup quarter-final in India.

He made his senior national team debut on 6 June 2019, in a friendly against Syria, as an 80th-minute substitute for Karim Ansarifard. Nine minutes after coming on, he scored the last goal of the game in a 5–0 victory. The goal broke Saeid Ezatolahi's record of the youngest goalscorer in Iran national team's history by almost two years.

Career statistics

Club

International

Scores and results list Iran's goal tally first, score column indicates score after each Sayyadmanesh goal.

Honours 
Zorya Luhansk
Ukrainian Cup runner-up: 2020–21

Iran U16
AFC U-16 Championship runner-up: 2016

Individual
Iranian Young Player of the Year: 2019
Hull City Player of the Month: April 2022

References

External links

 

Eurosport.com

F.F.I.R.I. 

2001 births
Living people
People from Amol
Sportspeople from Mazandaran province
Iranian footballers
Saipa F.C. players
Esteghlal F.C. players
Fenerbahçe S.K. footballers
İstanbulspor footballers
FC Zorya Luhansk players
Hull City A.F.C. players
Persian Gulf Pro League players
Süper Lig players
TFF First League players
Ukrainian Premier League players
English Football League players
Association football forwards
Iran youth international footballers
Iran international footballers
Iranian expatriate sportspeople in Turkey
Iranian expatriate sportspeople in Ukraine
Iranian expatriate footballers
Expatriate footballers in Turkey
Expatriate footballers in Ukraine